Alfred Jordan may refer to:
Alfred Jordan (footballer) (1900–1969), Irish footballer
Alfred Jordan (draughts player) (died 1926), English draughts player
Alfred Jordan (Canadian football), Canadian football cornerback